NATO (North Atlantic Treaty Organization) is an intergovernmental military alliance.

NATO or Nato may also refer to:

People
 n.A.T.o. (singer), Russian singer
 Norman Nato (born 1992), French professional racing driver
 Ofentse Nato (born 1989), Botswana footballer

Arts and entertainment
 NATO (album), an album by Laibach
 NATO: Operational Combat in Europe in the 1970s, a 1973 board wargame
 NATO Division Commander, a 1979 board wargame

Other uses
 National Association of Theatre Owners, an American association
 Nato, member tree species of the genus Mora
 Nato wood
 .nato, a deleted internet top level domain
 NATO, Southeast Asian slang for 'No Action, Talk Only'

See also

 
 
 
 Natto (disambiguation)
 Neato (disambiguation)
 Otan (disambiguation)
 5.56×45mm NATO, a standard rifle round
 7.62×51mm NATO, a standard rifle round
 nato.0+55+3d, software for realtime video and graphics
 NATO phonetic alphabet, a spelling alphabet
 NATO reporting name, a codename for non-NATO military equipment
 NATO Stock Number, a coding system for NATO military supply equipment
 NATOUSA (North African Theater of Operations)
 North American Alternative Trade Organization (NAATO), former name of the Fair Trade Federation
 Nattō, a Japanese food from fermented soybeans